The Belzu Cabinet constituted the 17th to 22nd cabinets of the Bolivian Republic. It was formed on 10 February 1849, 66 days after Manuel Isidoro Belzu was installed as the 11th president of Bolivia following a coup d'état, succeeding the Fourth Velasco Cabinet. It was dissolved on 15 August 1855 upon the end of Belzu's term and was succeeded by the Cabinet of Jorge Córdova.

Composition

History 
A few days after his assumption to office, Belzu charged all ministerial portfolios to Manuel José de Asín, as secretary general pending the formation of a proper ministerial cabinet. This charged was transferred to Lucas Mendoza de la Tapia on 17 January 1849. A full council of ministers was appointed on 10 February 1849, almost 2 months since the formation of the General Secretariat.

Due to various circumstances during Belzu's rule, the four ministries were reunited into a single General Secretariat during which time the minister of the interior was charged with executing all ministerial portfolios. This occurred on four occasions in 1849, 1852, from 1853 to 1854, and 1854. The longest of these was the first which lasted for 83 days between 18 March and 9 June 1849 while the shortest was the last at 26 days from 28 November to 24 December 1854.

The most prolific member of this cabinet was Rafael Bustillo who served a total of six different times, switching between the public instruction and finance portfolios. His longest single term was spent as minister of finance, lasting 822 days between 9 June 1849 and 9 September 1851. His shortest, at 64 days, came when he was reappointed to that position from 28 November 1853 to 31 January 1854. Cumulatively, he spent 1712 days (4 years and 8 months) as a government minister.

Cabinets

Structural changes

References

Notes

Footnotes

Bibliography 

 

1849 establishments in Bolivia
1855 disestablishments in Bolivia
Cabinets of Bolivia
Cabinets established in 1849
Cabinets disestablished in 1855